The Canton of Saint-Valery-en-Caux is a canton situated in the Seine-Maritime département and in the Normandy region of northern France.

Geography 
An area of fishing, farming and associated light industry, centred on the port of Saint-Valery-en-Caux.

Composition 
At the French canton reorganisation which came into effect in March 2015, the canton was expanded from 14 to 77 communes (7 of which merged into the new commune Terres-de-Caux):

Alvimare
Ancourteville-sur-Héricourt
Angiens
Anglesqueville-la-Bras-Long
Auberville-la-Manuel
Autigny
Bertheauville
Bertreville
Beuzeville-la-Guérard
Blosseville
Bosville
Le Bourg-Dun
Bourville
Brametot
Butot-Vénesville
Cailleville
Canouville
Cany-Barville
La Chapelle-sur-Dun
Clasville
Cleuville
Cléville
Cliponville
Crasville-la-Mallet
Crasville-la-Rocquefort
Drosay
Envronville
Ermenouville
Fontaine-le-Dun
Foucart
La Gaillarde
Grainville-la-Teinturière
Gueutteville-les-Grès
Le Hanouard
Hattenville
Hautot-l'Auvray
Héberville
Houdetot
Ingouville
Malleville-les-Grès
Manneville-ès-Plains
Le Mesnil-Durdent
Néville
Normanville
Ocqueville
Oherville
Ouainville
Ourville-en-Caux
Paluel
Pleine-Sève
Rocquefort
Saint-Aubin-sur-Mer
Sainte-Colombe
Saint-Martin-aux-Buneaux
Saint-Pierre-le-Vieux
Saint-Pierre-le-Viger
Saint-Riquier-ès-Plains
Saint-Sylvain
Saint-Vaast-Dieppedalle
Saint-Valery-en-Caux
Sasseville
Sommesnil
Sotteville-sur-Mer
Terres-de-Caux
Thiouville
Trémauville
Veauville-lès-Quelles
Veules-les-Roses  
Veulettes-sur-Mer
Vittefleur
Yébleron

Population

See also 
 Arrondissements of the Seine-Maritime department
 Cantons of the Seine-Maritime department
 Communes of the Seine-Maritime department

References

Saint-Valery-en-Caux